Uchino is a Japanese surname. Notable people with the surname include:

, American engineer
, Japanese footballer and manager
, Japanese gravure idol
, Japanese actor
, Japanese modern pentathlete
, Japanese footballer
, Japanese footballer
, Japanese sprint canoeist

See also
11929 Uchino, a main-belt asteroid
Uchino Station, a railway station in Niigata, Niigata Prefecture, Japan

Japanese-language surnames